The War Between Men and Women is a 1972 American comedy-drama film directed by Melville Shavelson and starring Jack Lemmon, Barbara Harris, and Jason Robards. The film is based on the writings of humorist James Thurber, and was released by Cinema Center Films. It features animated cartoons interspersed in the story based on Thurber's works. Shavelson was creator of the 1969 Thurber-based television series My World and Welcome to It. The screenplay is by Shavelson and by Danny Arnold, who also worked on the 1969 series.  Lisa Gerritsen, who plays Linda Kozlenko in the film, previously co-starred in My World and Welcome to It as Lydia Monroe.

Plot

Peter Wilson (Jack Lemmon) is a sarcastic near-sighted cartoonist, author, and swinging bachelor living in Manhattan. He detests women, dogs, and children. He is flustered by women's priorities and avoids commitment, much preferring transient physical relationships. At the office of his eye surgeon, Peter meets a leggy, eye-catching strong-willed woman named Terri Kozlenko (Barbara Harris). He likes her very much, but discovers later that she is a single mother to three children, Caroline, Linda, and David. The first thing she learns about him, from his ophthalmologist, is that he's in danger of losing his sight, which would make it impossible for him to continue his work.

Nevertheless, they develop a close friendship that grows into romance, when Peter realizes that Terri is the only woman who can tolerate his strong anti-feminist opinions. When she rejects his plan of a sexual relationship conducted exclusively at his bachelor pad (so that he doesn't have to bond with her demanding family), he reluctantly proposes to her. They get married and he moves into her apartment, but her rogue ex-husband Stephen (Jason Robards) appears to spend more time with their children. Stephen and Peter clash at first, but they soon become good drinking friends, much to Terri's disapproval. Peter also begins to bond with David, who has had no stable male role model with his father perpetually off photographing war zones.

Peter's eyesight gradually worsens and his boss, Howard Mann (Herb Edelman), begins to criticize his work. On the advice of his ophthalmologist, Peter schedules an operation that could cure his problem, and tries to keep it a secret from Terri to avoid worrying her.  Howard gets hysterical and inadvertently ruins Peter's alibi of working away from home on a book. Terri tells him that she had known that Peter was going blind before they ever got involved. This revelation enrages Peter, and he accuses her of only going to bed with him out of pity.  She says she never once felt sorry for him, but his pride is too wounded to accept this.

The operation is partly successful in restoring Peter's vision, and he moves out of the house to his old studio to begin work on a new book, The Last Flower

Stephen is killed on assignment, which traumatizes everyone, but Linda in particular.  Her stammer is getting progressively worse. Terri insists she go talk to Peter, who takes her on an imaginary visual tour of his new book—which is about war and human stupidity, but also love and hope and restoration. She begins to conquer her stammer, and he realizes he was wrong to leave his new family, who need him.  He meets Terri at a party related to the release of his new book, and they renew their bond.  Much against his misanthropic nature, he is forced to rejoin humanity.

Cast
 Jack Lemmon as Peter Edward Wilson
 Barbara Harris as Theresa Alice Kozlenko
 Jason Robards as Stephen Kozlenko
 Herb Edelman as Howard Mann
 Lisa Gerritsen as Linda Kozlenko
 Moosie Drier as David Kozlenko
 Severn Darden as Dr. Harris
 Lisa Eilbacher as Caroline Kozlenko
 Lucille Meredith as Mrs. Schenker
 Ruth McDevitt as Old Woman
 Lea Marmer as Old Hag
 Joey Faye as Delivery boy
 Alan DeWitt as Man
 John Zaremba as Minister
 Richard Gates as Bernie (as Rick Gates)
 Janya Braunt as Nurse
 Olive Dunbar as Woman at Literary Tea
 Margaret Muse as Woman at Literary Tea
 Bill Hickman as Large Gentleman (as William Hickman)
 Joyce Brothers as Herself (as Dr. Joyce Brothers)
 Danny Arnold as Manhattan Policeman
 Burt Richards as Book Salesman

Award nomination
The screenplay by Melville Shavelson and Danny Arnold was nominated for a Writers Guild of America Award for Best Comedy Written Directly for the Screen.

Home media
Like many other films in the Cinema Center catalog, The War Between Men and Women was long unavailable on home video, with the exception of a brief release on VHS in 2000, although it was shown on television. It was released to DVD by Paramount Pictures Home Entertainment on January 28, 2014, as a Region 1 widescreen DVD. It was released on Blu-ray in 2016 by Kino Lorber.

See also
 List of American films of 1972

References

External links
 
 
 

1972 films
1972 comedy-drama films
American comedy-drama films
Films about blind people
Films about fictional painters
Films about writers
Films scored by Marvin Hamlisch
Films based on works by James Thurber
Films directed by Melville Shavelson
Films set in New York City
American independent films
Cinema Center Films films
1972 independent films
1970s English-language films
1970s American films